The Senate Commerce Subcommittee on Consumer Protection, Product Safety, and Data Security is a subcommittee within the United States Senate Committee on Commerce, Science, and Transportation. It was formerly named the Subcommittee on Manufacturing, Trade, and Consumer Protection, Subcommittee on Consumer Affairs, Insurance, and Automotive Safety and the Subcommittee on Consumer Protection, Product Safety, Insurance and Data Security before getting its current title at the beginning of the 117th United States Congress.

Jurisdiction
The Subcommittee on Consumer Protection, Product Safety, and Data Security is responsible for consumer affairs, consumer protection, and consumer product safety; product liability; property and casualty insurance; manufacturing and workforce development; sports-related matters; and data privacy, security, and protection. The subcommittee also conducts oversight on the Federal Trade Commission (FTC) and Consumer Product Safety Commission (CPSC), as well as manufacturing and trade related matters within the Department of Commerce.

Members, 118th Congress

Historical subcommittee rosters

117th Congress

116th Congress

Notable activities

2021 Facebook whistleblower hearing 
Following the 2021 Facebook leak controversy, the subcommittee under then-chairman Richard Blumenthal (D-CT) held a hearing titled "Protecting Kids Online: Testimony from a Facebook Whistleblower". Held on October 5, 2021, the hearing featured testimony from Frances Haugen, a former Facebook product manager who disclosed tens of thousands of internal documents to the Securities and Exchange Commission (SEC) and The Wall Street Journal. 

During the hearing, Haugen testified that the social media platform has harmed young users' mental health and facilitated the spread of dangerous misinformation. Haugen's testimony was praised by a bipartisan group of Senators, including Blumenthal and Marsha Blackburn, a Republican from Tennessee.

References

External links
Consumer Protection, Product Safety, and Data Security

Commerce Consumer